Aliovsat Shirali oghlu Sadigov (December 21, 1906 — November 17, 1970) was an Azerbaijani opera singer, People's Artist of the Azerbaijan SSR.

Biography 
Aliovsat Sadigov was born on December 21, 1906 in Nukha. He studied at the Azerbaijan State Conservatoire in 1928–1930. His voice was a lyric tenor. After graduation, he began working as a soloist at the Azerbaijan State Opera and Ballet Theater in 1930–1963.

The characters he created are more remarkable in Uzeyir Hajibeyov's "Leyli and Majnun" (Majnun, Ibn Salam and Zayd), "Asli and Kerem" (Kerem), "Koroghlu" (Eyvaz), Zulfugar Hajibeyov's "Ashig Garib" (Garib), Reinhold Glière's "Shahsanam" (Ashig Garib and Ashig Samad), Muslim Magomayev's "Shah Ismayil" (Shah Ismayil), "Nargiz" (Molla Mutallim), translated "Safa" (Ashig Musa) operas and Uzeyir Hajibeyov's "Arshin mal alan" (Suleyman), "Mashadi Ibad"(Hambal and Sarvar) operettas.

In the last years of his life he worked as a consultant pedagogue at the Opera Theater. Aliovsat Sadigov died in Baku on November 17, 1970, and was buried in the Second Alley of Honor.

Awards 
 People's Artist of the Azerbaijan SSR — 1956
 Honored Artist of the Azerbaijan SSR
 Order of the Badge of Honour

References 

20th-century Azerbaijani male opera singers
1906 births
1970 deaths